Zawisty may refer to:

Zawisty Nadbużne, village in the district of Gmina Małkinia Górna, within Ostrów Mazowiecka County, Masovian Voivodeship, in east-central Poland
Zawisty Podleśne, village in the district of Gmina Małkinia Górna, within Ostrów Mazowiecka County, Masovian Voivodeship, in east-central Poland
Zawisty-Dworaki, village in the district of Gmina Boguty-Pianki, within Ostrów Mazowiecka County, Masovian Voivodeship, in east-central Poland
Zawisty-Króle, village in the district of Gmina Boguty-Pianki, within Ostrów Mazowiecka County, Masovian Voivodeship, in east-central Poland
Zawisty-Kruki, village in the district of Gmina Boguty-Pianki, within Ostrów Mazowiecka County, Masovian Voivodeship, in east-central Poland
Zawisty-Piotrowice, village in the district of Gmina Boguty-Pianki, within Ostrów Mazowiecka County, Masovian Voivodeship, in east-central Poland
Zawisty-Wity, village in the district of Gmina Boguty-Pianki, within Ostrów Mazowiecka County, Masovian Voivodeship, in east-central Poland